Morgan Nix (born 1968) is an Irish former sportsperson. He played Gaelic football with his local club Kerins O'Rahilly's and was a member of the Kerry senior inter-county team between 1988 and 1995.

References

 

1968 births
Living people
Kerins O'Rahilly's Gaelic footballers
Kerry inter-county Gaelic footballers
Munster inter-provincial Gaelic footballers
People from Tralee